Chinese chess primarily refers to xiangqi, a two-player Chinese game in a family of strategic board games of which Western chess, Indian chaturanga, Japanese shogi, and the more similar Korean janggi are also members. This may also refer to:

Chess in China (international, western, chess)
Chinese Chess Association

See also 
Chinese checkers
Wei qi (Go)
Chess (disambiguation)